Abaco Dream was an American rock group from New York City, United States.

History
The members were Paul Douglas, David Williams, Dennis Williams, Frank Malo, and Mike Sassano.  Their 1969 release, the Sly Stone-written "Life and Death in G & A", peaked at number 74 on the Billboard Hot 100 and at number 58 on the Cashbox Top 100 (A&M 1081). Another single from the group, "Another Night of Love/Chocolate Pudding", did not chart when released in 1970.

All four Abaco Dream tracks were produced by Ted Cooper, who was a music executive at Double M Productions at the time, and had previously worked at Epic Records, Sly Stone's record label.

Singles discography
A&M 1081 - "Life and Death in G & A" written by Sylvester Stewart / "Catwoman" written by Eric Siday
A&M 1160 - "Another Night Of Love" / "Chocolate Pudding" both written by Arthur Miller

Sly and the Family Stone
Some musicologists, such as Joel Whitburn, believe that "Life and Death in G & A" is actually a performance by Sly and the Family Stone. They note the similarity in performance of this song to other Family Stone songs and the dissimilarity between this song and other Abaco Dream releases. The song also appears on the CD compilation Listen To The Voices: Sly Stone In The Studio 1965-1970, issued by Ace Records. The vocals are attributed to Joe Hicks who, in 1970, performed a cover version for Stone's Stone Flower label.

References

External links

A&M Records artists
Rock music groups from New York (state)